Janet Stewart, Lady Fleming (17 July 1502 – 20 February 1562), called la Belle Écossaise (French for 'the Beautiful Scotswoman'), was a Scottish courtier. She was an illegitimate daughter of King James IV of Scotland who served as governess to her half-niece Mary, Queen of Scots. Janet was briefly a mistress of King Henry II of France, by whom she had a legitimated son: Henri d'Angoulême. Her daughter, Mary Fleming, was one of the young queen's "Four Marys".

Family
Janet Stewart (also referred to as Jane, Jenny, and other variants) was the fifth illegitimate child of the Stewart king James IV to reach adulthood. Her half-brothers included James Stewart, 1st Earl of Moray; Alexander Stewart, Lord Chancellor of Scotland; and James V, King of Scots, her father's only surviving legitimate child.

Her mother—the fourth royal mistress of James IV to bear his offspring—was Agnes (secondarily known as Isabel), daughter of James Stewart, 1st Earl of Buchan (who bore the nickname "Hearty James"). Janet's parents were distantly related (precisely, half second cousins once removed) by a common ancestor: Joan Beaufort, Queen of Scots.

Marriage and issue
Janet Stewart married Malcolm Fleming, 3rd Lord Fleming, despite being related within a forbidden degree of affinity. They had eight children:

 Johanna (born 1525)
 Janet (born 1527), who was first married to John, Master of Livingston, killed at the battle of Pinkie 1547, eldest son of Alexander Livingston, 5th Lord Livingston, and a brother of Mary Livingston, one of Queen Mary's "Four Marys"
 Margaret Fleming (born by 1532), who married Robert Graham, Master of Montrose, by whom she had a son, John Graham, 3rd Earl of Montrose; then was remarried to Thomas Erskine, Master of Erskine (younger brother of the John Erskine, 6th Lord Erskine), but had no issue; and thirdly, married John Stewart, 4th Earl of Atholl, by whom she had a son John Stewart, 5th Earl of Atholl and three daughters. Margaret Fleming was said to be a witch possessing the power to cast spells.
 James Fleming, 4th Lord Fleming (?born 1534), who married Barbara Hamilton, his daughter Jean Fleming (1554–1609) married John Maitland of Thirlestane, the younger brother of William Maitland of Lethington the husband of his sister Mary Fleming. His grandson was John Maitland, 1st Earl of Lauderdale.
 Elizabeth (born 1530)
 John Fleming, 5th Lord Fleming (?born 1535).
 Agnes (born 1535), who married William Livingstone, 6th Lord Livingston
 Mary Fleming (born 1543), was one of the  "Four Marys"  the ladies in waiting to Mary, Queen of Scots who married William Maitland of Lethington

Court life
Lord Fleming was killed at the Battle of Pinkie in 1547. The following year, presumably due to her unofficial membership in the royal Stewart family, the widow Fleming was appointed governess or nurse to her infant half-niece Mary, Queen of Scots (her new mistress having been fathered by her late half-brother). Her own daughter, Mary Fleming, also joined the queen's household as a lady-in-waiting.

In August 1548, mother and daughter accompanied the young queen to France. They waited aboard ship on the Clyde at Dumbarton Castle for a time. Lady Fleming asked Captain Villegaignon if the queen could go back ashore to rest. Villegaignon swore she would go to France or drown on the way.

Giovanni Ferrerio wrote to Robert Reid, Bishop of Orkney, concerned about Lady Fleming's lack of French or Latin. As she was only fluent in Scots, he doubted her ability to communicate to French doctors any symptoms of illness seen in Mary. He hoped Reid would speak to Mary of Guise to secure the appointment of a Scottish physician, William Bog.

At the royal court of France, Lady Fleming soon attracted the attentions of King Henry II and became his lover. Their affair resulted in pregnancy, and—either before or after bearing the French monarch an illegitimate son—Janet was sent back to Scotland and replaced as governess to Mary by Françoise de Paroy. Her boy, called Henri de Valois-Angoulême (1551–June, 1586), was "the chief and most highly favored natural son of the King". He was legitimized and went on to become the "Grand Prior of France, Governor of Provence, and Admiral of the Levantine Sea."

In November 1549 the English prisoner James Wilford was exchanged for the release of her son James, Lord Fleming, who had been captured during the war of the Rough Wooing. In October 1552, Janet's situation in Scotland was described by Mary of Guise in a letter written to her brother, the Cardinal of Lorraine. There had been talk of marrying Janet off to Henri Cleutin, Guise's military advisor. Although one of Janet's daughters had informed Mary of Guise that her mother did not wish to leave Scotland, Guise knew that Janet had discussed leaving Scotland with the Governor, Regent Arran, and wanted to see Henry II that winter. Guise told the Cardinal to reassure Catherine de' Medici, the queen of France, that Janet would not be leaving Scotland.

Janet was one of the ladies who kept vigil over the body of Mary of Guise at Edinburgh Castle in June 1560. The ladies were not at first given mourning clothes, and Janet quoted in Latin a phrase from the Book of Joel to the English diplomat Thomas Randolph, "Scindite corda vestra, non vestimenta," Rend your heart, not your garments. Afterwards, Janet applied to the Privy Council for permission to leave Scotland with her son "Lord Hary de Valoys" on 22 August 1560. Henry took part in the St. Bartholomew's Day massacre and was killed in a duel in 1586.

References

Sources 
 Riddell, John (1843). . Edinburgh.
 Weir, Alison (2004). . New York: Random House Trade Paperbacks.

1502 births
1563 deaths
Court of James V of Scotland
Scottish governesses
Janet
House of Valois-Angoulême
Illegitimate children of James IV of Scotland
Mistresses of Henry II of France
Ladies of Parliament
Scottish ladies-in-waiting
Scottish people of Danish descent
Governesses to the Scottish court
16th-century Scottish educators
16th-century Scottish women
Court of Mary, Queen of Scots
Daughters of kings